Eteuati "Jack" Tema is a New Zealand visual effects artist. He is known for working on films such as Avatar, Dawn of the Planet of the Apes and The Jungle Book.

He won a 2015 Annie Award for Outstanding Achievement, Character Animation in a Live Action Production for his work on Dawn of the Planet of the Apes.

Selected filmography
 Avatar (2009)
 Dawn of the Planet of the Apes (2014)
 The Jungle Book (2016)

References

External links

Living people
Annie Award winners
Visual effects artists
Year of birth missing (living people)